Sarenga is a Town in the Sarenga CD block in the Khatra subdivision of the Bankura district  in the state of West Bengal, India.

Geography

Location

Area overview
The map alongside shows the Khatra subdivision of Bankura district. Physiographically, this area is having uneven lands with hard rocks. In the Khatra CD block area there are some low hills. The Kangsabati project reservoir is prominently visible in the map. The subdued patches of shaded area in the map show forested areas It is an almost fully rural area.

Note: The map alongside presents some of the notable locations in the subdivision. All places marked in the map are linked in the larger full screen map.

Demographics
According to the 2011 Census of India, Sarenga had a total population of 5,888 of which 2,996 (51%) were males and 2,892 (49%) were females. Population in the age range of 0–6 years was 592. The total number of literates in Sarenga was 4,486 (84.71% of the population over 6 years).

.*For language details see Sarenga, Bankura (community development block)#Language and religion

Civic administration

Police station
Sarenga police station has jurisdiction over the Sarenga  CD block. The area covered is 235.68  km2with a population of 95,096.

CD block HQ
The headquarters of Sarenga CD block are located at Sarenga.

Education
Sarenga M.S.Bidyapith, is a Bengali-medium coeducational institution established in 1949. It has facilities for teaching from class V to class XII. The school has 4 computers, a library with 631 books and a playground.

Sarenga Girls High School, is a Bengali-medium girls only institution established in 1964. It has facilities for teaching from class V to class XII. The school has 2 computers and a library with 2,750 books.

Sarenga High School, is a Bengali-medium coeducational institution established in 1955. It has facilities for teaching from class V to class X. The school has a library with 815 books and a playground.

Pandit Raghunath Murmu Smriti Mahavidyalaya was established at Baragari in 1986. The college is affiliated to the Bankura University, It offers honours courses in Bengali, Santali, English, Sanskrit, geography, history, political science, philosophy, computer science, mathematics, physics, chemistry, economics, forestry, and general courses in science and arts. It offers post-graduate courses in Bengali, Santali, Geo-Informatics, Geography and Rural Development & Planning.

Healthcare
Sarenga Rural Hospital, with 30 beds at Krishnapur, is the major government medical facility in the Sarenga CD block. There are primary health centres at Dumurtor (Tikarpara) Sarenga (with 6 beds), Krishnapur (Dumurtor) (with 10 beds).

References

Villages in Bankura district